Dad's Army is a 1971 British war comedy film and the first film adaptation of the BBC television sitcom Dad's Army (1968-1977). Directed by Norman Cohen, it was filmed between series three and four and was based upon material from the early episodes of the television series. The film tells the story of the Home Guard platoon's formation and their subsequent endeavours at a training exercise. The film version of the television series comprises the following cast members: Arthur Lowe (Captain George Mainwaring), John Le Mesurier (Sergeant Arthur Wilson), Clive Dunn (Lance Corporal Jack Jones), John Laurie (Private James Frazer), Arnold Ridley (Private Charles Godfrey), Ian Lavender (Private Frank Pike) and James Beck (Private Joe Walker).

Plot
1940 – Operation Dynamo has just taken place. From the newly conquered French coastline, a Wehrmacht colonel looks out over the English Channel with powerful binoculars. Surveying the white cliffs of Dover, he spies Godfrey emerging from a lavatory. Godfrey joins the rest of his platoon, who are defiantly waving the Union Flag. The colonel fumes contemptuously, "How can the stupid British ever hope to win?!"

One morning, George Mainwaring, the manager of the Walmington-on-Sea branch of Martins Bank, and his chief clerk, Arthur Wilson, listen to Anthony Eden making a radio broadcast about forming the Local Defence Volunteers (LDV). At the local police station chaos ensues because there is nobody to organise the enrolment of the men. Characteristically, Mainwaring takes charge and after commandeering the local church hall he registers the assembled volunteers, with weapons being inspected.

The local platoon is eventually formed with Mainwaring in command as captain, Wilson as his sergeant and Jack Jones as the lance-corporal, plus Frazer, Godfrey, Pike and Walker as privates. With no weapons or training, the platoon is initially forced to improvise, using devices invented and assembled by Jones. These invariably backfire or malfunction with disastrous consequences. The chaos includes an anti-aircraft rocket launcher blowing up a farmer's barn and a one-man tank made from a cast iron bathtub rolling into the river with Private Joe Walker still inside. The platoon secures uniforms and, eventually, weapons. Following the evacuation from Dunkirk, the LDV is renamed the Home Guard.

The platoon is ordered to take part in a war games/training weekend, but Lance-Corporal Jones's van, recently converted to gas under Mainwaring's orders, breaks down after Jones accidentally pushes his bayonet through the roof of the van into the gas bag on the roof. They are towed by a steam roller. Out of control, the roller destroys the platoon's tents, as well as other equipment, angering Major-General Fullard who is in charge of the weekend exercises, and who is already cross with Mainwaring for previously refusing to cash his cheque at the bank, still under the impression that Mainwaring is a bank clerk.

After a night sleeping without tents the platoon, bar Wilson, oversleep and miss breakfast despite being detailed to hold a pontoon bridge during the day's exercise. The bridge has been sabotaged by the Royal Marines and the results are comically chaotic, with Jones atop on a drifting white horse. Captain Mainwaring is summoned by the major-general and told that due to the platoon's poor showing he will recommend Mainwaring be replaced.

While the platoon are walking back to Walmington, a Luftwaffe reconnaissance aircraft is shot down and its three-man crew parachutes to safety. That night, they enter Walmington Church Hall, where a meeting is taking place to raise money to fund half of a Spitfire, the other half being funded by another nearby town. They hold all present as hostages, including the mayor and vicar, and demand a boat back to France. Mainwaring and his men reach home and discover what has happened. By this point Fullard, the Navy, the Marines and the police have begun to arrive.

The Home Guard platoon infiltrate the building though the church crypt. Dressed in choir surplices, they enter the church hall singing All Things Bright and Beautiful, with their own extemporised second verse. Mainwaring takes a revolver concealed under a collection plate and confronts the Luftwaffe leader, who aims his Luger pistol at him. Both officers agree they will shoot at the count of three, with Mainwaring warning the Germans that if he dies, 7 men will take his place. The platoon then draws their rifles from beneath their white robes. The German intruders reluctantly surrender, with Fullard left stunned at the sight of the victorious Home Guard. Mainwaring and his men become the pride of the town. Wilson reveals that the German officer's gun was empty. Smiling, Mainwaring replies, "So was mine".

In the final scenes, Mainwaring and the Home Guard look towards France from the cliffs. The weather has changed for the worse and it is unlikely that Hitler will ever invade, although that does not stop the group lying down and listening when they start to suspect they have detected a Nazi attempt to tunnel into Britain.

Cast

 Arthur Lowe as Captain Mainwaring
 John Le Mesurier as Sergeant Wilson
 Clive Dunn as Lance-Corporal Jones
 John Laurie as Private Frazer
 James Beck as Private Walker
 Arnold Ridley as Private Godfrey
 Ian Lavender as Private Pike
 Liz Fraser as Mrs Pike (portrayed by Janet Davies in the television series)
 Bernard Archard as Major General Fullard
 Derek Newark as Regimental Sergeant Major
 Bill Pertwee as Hodges
 Frank Williams as Vicar
 Edward Sinclair as Verger
 Anthony Sagar as Police Sergeant
 Pat Coombs as Mrs Hall
 Roger Maxwell as General Wilkinson ("Peppery Old Gent")
 Paul Dawkins as Nazi General
 Sam Kydd as Nazi Orderly
 Michael Knowles as Staff Captain
 Fred Griffiths as Bert King

Production
Filming took place between 10 August and 25 September 1970, at Shepperton Studios and various locations, notably Chalfont St Giles in Buckinghamshire and Seaford in East Sussex, as well as the church of St Mary Magdalene, Shepperton, which is adjacent to the studios.

Differences from the television series

The film made a number of significant changes, imposed by Columbia Pictures, such as recasting Liz Fraser as Mavis Pike instead of Janet Davies and filming outdoor scenes in Chalfont St Giles rather than Thetford. Also, the bank was now Martins (a genuine bank of the time) rather than Swallow, and, with the increase in budget, the set interiors and the vehicles used were completely different, and the streets of Walmington had extras walking on them. The audience saw the Germans preparing across the Channel, rather than them simply being an unseen threat, and the events of the platoon's formation were revised in various ways for the big screen treatment.

Many of the changes, in particular the recasting of Mrs Pike, met with criticism. Fraser was chosen because director Cohen wanted a less homely, more "sexy" actress for the role. Perry has said "It was a mistake...not to cast Janet in the role because the viewing public has come to recognise her as Mrs. Pike. But that was a decision made by Columbia.".

Another less notable change was the vehicle portraying Jones' butcher's van. In the series, the van was a 1935 Ford BB (still registered as BUC 852), whereas a closed cab Ford Model AA was used for the film.

Release
Dad's Army was passed with a U certificate by the British Board of Film Censors on 27 January 1971. Its UK premiere was on Sunday 14 March 1971 at the Columbia Cinema in London.

Reception
Critical reviews were mixed, but it was the fifth most financially successful film at the United Kingdom box office of the year.

Sequel
Discussions were held about a possible sequel, to be called Dad's Army and the Secret U-Boat Base, but the project never came to fruition.
A second film was released in 2016 with an almost entirely new cast, also titled Dad's Army.

References

External links
 
 
 Filming locations from the Dad's Army Movie

Dad's Army (1971 film)
1971 films
1970s war comedy films
British war comedy films
Films based on television series
Films directed by Norman Cohen
Films set in 1940
Films set in Kent
Films shot in Buckinghamshire
Military humor in film
Films shot at Shepperton Studios
Columbia Pictures films
Films set on the home front during World War II
1971 comedy films
British World War II films
1970s English-language films
1970s British films